Pajama Friends is a South Korea variety show  program on Lifetime starring Song Ji-hyo, Red Velvet's Joy, Jang Yoon-ju and Cheng Xiao. The show aired on Lifetime from September 15 to December 8, 2018. Subsequent episodes will air on every Saturday at 22:30 (KST) on Lifetime.

Synopsis 
Pajama Friends is a reality program about four women (Song Ji-hyo, Joy, Jang Yoon-ju and Cheng Xiao) who work in different fields in the industry and come together to enjoy 2-day-and-1-night vacations in hotels of various styles within Korea. Due to the women's shared preferences, the locations commonly have a spa pool and/or swimming pool.

Guests

Special cast

Hotels and attractions featured 

 Four Seasons Hotel, Gwanghwamun, Jongno-gu, Seoul (ep1 - 2), a world-renowned 5-star hotel chain.
 Gyeongwonjae Ambassador Incheon, Yeonsu-gu, Incheon (ep3 - 4), the only five-star hotel in a form of a traditional Korean Palace in the 16th century. Well known for being surrounded by modern skyscrapers, and was used as the filming location for both The Lonely and Great God – Goblin and Tempted.
Banyan Tree Club & Spa Seoul, Namsan, Seoul (ep6 - 7), a world-renowned 5-star spa, resort and hotel chain with a villa concept.
Park Roche Hotel, Jeongseon, Gangwon-do, (ep8-9), the first 4-star hotel, and the first hotel featured in the countryside. Its main theme is holistic wellbeing, which includes many lessons, but unlike a gym, its sole purpose is to relax your mind and detox your body.
Lotte World, Jamsil-dong, Seoul (ep10), a recreation complex includes its own hotel, amusement park, aquarium, ice rink and zoo. They were only in for the thrill rides before heading off to the hotel.
Vista WalkerHill Seoul, Gwangjin-gu, Seoul (ep10-11) American-style hotel chain on the edge of Seoul. Situated on the less populous side of Han River, Seoul resting on Achasan Mountain. First hotels in Korea to have IOT voice-command services for adjusting lighting, curtains, etc.
Anati Cove Spa & Resorts, Gijan, Busan (ep 12-13) Overseeing the sea, while it is known for its spa and swimming pool, it also boast its own mini shopping town, large library with mini library in each extremely large hotel apartment units.
Hilton Hotel, Busan, a world-renowned 5-star hotel chain. Opened in February 2017, was used as the filming location for The Bride of Habaek. They only stayed there for post-production meals with production crew.

Common timing checkpoints 

 Early Check-in (3rd stop): 11am
Assembly: 1 pm
 Check-in: 2 pm or 3pm
 Dinner: 7 pm
 Arrival of Cinderella boy: 10 pm
 Cinderella boy leaves: 12 am
 Clean-down time: 12:30am
 Daniel's Wake-up call: 7:30 am (disabled in 5th stop)
 Morning exercise: 9 am
 Check-out: 11am or 12 pm

PJPJ 
PJPJ is a non-promotional dance group spawned from the final episode, with Seolhyun as the leader and dance instructor and Yoon-ju as the MV director.

References

External links 

 Naver TV
VLive

Korean-language television shows
2018 South Korean television series debuts